Corsairs: Conquest at Sea, also known as simply Corsairs, is a 1999 strategy/action/adventure game for the PC, developed and published by Microïds (known for Syberia and its continuation Syberia II). The game is a simulation of the life of a privateer employed by either England, France, The Netherlands or Spain in, most likely, the 17th century. The player can take part in either the campaign, which consists of several scenarios with a specific goal, or adventure mode, where the goal is simply to capture all the ports on the map for their nation.

Reception

Corsairs generally received mixed reviews according to the review aggregation website GameRankings. It was often deemed as being buggy and having outdated sound and graphics, but praised for having a decent storyline and being creative. The game has limited ability to run on Windows 2000 and newer Windows operating systems, even with compatibility modes. Adam Pavlacka of NextGen said of the game, "If a little more work had gone into polishing the gameplay, this could have been a real gem. As it is, it's a lump of coal."

References

External links
 Corsairs at Microids
 

1999 video games
Age of Discovery video games
Microïds games
Naval video games
Strategy video games
Video games about pirates
Video games developed in France
Video games set in the Caribbean
Windows games
Windows-only games